Porin is a grand opera by Vatroslav Lisinski. The Croatian text was by Dimitrija Demeter. It was Lisinski's second opera, the second for Croatia.

It was composed during 1848-51 but not performed until 2 October 1897, when it was staged in Zagreb.

Sources
 Lisinski, Vatroslav by Lovro Županović, in 'The New Grove Dictionary of Opera', ed. Stanley Sadie (London, 1992) 

Compositions by Vatroslav Lisinski
Croatian-language operas
1897 operas
Operas